Buka Island is the second-largest island in the Autonomous Region of Bougainville, in eastern Papua New Guinea. It is in Buka Rural LLG of North Bougainville District, with the Autonomous Region's and district's capital city of Buka on the island.

Buka, Bougainville Island and the Tabar Islands and their surrounding waters are identified as being part of the Solomon Archipelago terrestrial ecoregion and marine ecoregion.

History 
Buka was first occupied by humans in the Paleolithic period, with evidence for human habitation at Kilu Cave some 30,000 years ago.

British, Australian and American whaling ships visited the island in the nineteenth century for food, water and wood. The first on record was the Eliza in 1806, and the last known visit was by the Palmetto in 1881.

The present inhabitants speak languages that are from the eastward push of Austronesian languages of the Lapita Culture complex, some 2,700 years ago.

In 1899 the German Empire laid claim to the island, annexing it into German New Guinea.

World War II
Buka Island was occupied by Japanese troops during World War II, and it was the site of important Japanese airfields that were considered strategic by the allies. Although the island was bombed by allied air forces and warships, allied armies never fought in Buka. After holding out for years on poor supplies, the Japanese surrendered in 1945 when allied troops were approaching the Selau peninsula on nearby Bougainville.

Economy

The economy of Buka can be divided into a very small urban component and the village sector. The village sector is characterised by subsistence farming, primarily of sweet potato as a staple food, and the production of copra and cocoa as cash crops by family-sized units and small cooperative work groups. Vanilla and tropical spice crops have made a halting progress, and remain very minor sources of income for villagers.

The urban sector at Buka Passage includes the Bougainville representatives of major New Guinean business, such as Bank South Pacific, CPL (which purchases cash crops), Agmark, presence of the Autonomous Bougainville Government, which is based in Kubu, near Buka Passage. There are a number of small businesses in the island.

Buka Airport is the principal airport in the Bougainville area.  It has scheduled service to Rabaul, Lae, and Port Moresby.

Geography
The east coast is the windward side for most of the year, and is characterised by a coastal cliff that rises close to the ocean, leaving only a narrow and often rocky beach. A coral reef rings the entire island, it is narrow on the east coast, which is battered by oceanic winds and large waves; it spreads out into lagoons on the west coast.

Along the western coast there is a small mountain range, named the Richard Parkinson Range, after the German planter and explorer. The range runs between Buka and Carola Harbour. The few larger rivers on the island flow from headwaters in the range's interior. The largest is the Gagan River.

The rest of the island is a large raised limestone formation. The cliffs correspond to the reef of an ancient lagoon.

The limestone morphology means that there is very little surface water available throughout most of the island. This poses a problem for the island's residents, especially during the dry season, when water is collected by villagers from "kukubui" springs along the foot of the cliffs.

Subdivisions
The island is divided into five Autonomous Bougainville Government electorates: 
Haku
Peit (covering the West Coast and Solos)
Halia (from Tohatsi to Hahalis),
Hagogohe (from Salasa to Sing)
Tsitalato (from Lonahan to Buka Passage).

Each of these electorates has its own local government, known as Councils of Elders.

Buka is the main city on Buka Island, and the present-day capital of the Autonomous Region of Bougainville. It is located on the northern coast of Buka Passage. On old maps it is named "Chinatown". The land the city occupies was formally known as Leta. There has been considerable expansion of the city in recent years, and also in nearby Kubu, location of the Autonomous Bougainville Government Parliament, and Hutjena, the location of the national high school serving Buka.

Language and ethnic groups
The main island of Buka is occupied by two distinct language groups, Solos and Halia. The latter is split into two dialects in Buka Island: Hanahan Halia spoken along the east coast from Buka Passage (known locally as Ieta) to Tohatsi and Haku, spoken in the north coast villages from Elutupan to Lontis. A third dialect of Halia, known as Selau is spoken in the peninsula of the same name in north Bougainville. Halia and Haku speakers easily understand each other, Selau is a more distant dialect. Solos is a distinct language within the North Bougainvillean Austronesian family, and Halia and Solos are not mutually intelligible.

On the west coast of Buka there are five small inhabited islands that have close cultural and linguistic ties to the main island of Buka. From north to south these are Pororan and nearby Hitau, Petats and Yamen and Matsungan. The language of these islands is distinct from Halia and Solos, but resembles Halia more closely than it does Solos. This language is referred to as Petats in the linguistic literature, and as West Coast in Buka.

All languages spoken by the indigenous population of Buka are part of the North Bougainvillean Austronesian group of languages. They show some affinity to the languages of Nissan Island and New Ireland and are part of the Melanesian branch of the Austronesian language family.

Contemporary Bukas often use Tok Pisin as a lingua franca between the three main language groups.

Culture and customs
Although separated into three or four different language groups, Buka society shows very similar traits throughout the island. Traditional Buka society conformed to a broad pattern of Melanesian horticultural organisation. Coastal (or "tasi" – beach) villagers, namely the Haku, Halia and West Coast speakers, planted taro, kept chickens, fished and collected shellfish. The Solos fished in Buka's rivers and traded forest products and taro with the Halia and West Coast islanders. As in most Pacific Islands, pigs were, and still are, extremely important and are seldom eaten except in the course of rituals and formal feasts. The cuscus (a type of marsupial) and various birds also supplement the diet.

Descent is matrilineal and the kinship terminology is based on a Hawaiian system. Buka kinship does not prescribe a post-marital residence, but it is generally preferred that a young couple live first with the husband's maternal relatives, and later move to the wife's land. The reason for this is that though a man will require assistance from his clansfolk, his children belong to his wife's clan.

Chiefs 
There are inherited positions of authority for men, or chieftainships called tsunono (in Halia, or close cognates in the other languages). Women can also be "chiefs", known as teitahol in Halia and tuhikauu in Haku. Traditionally, women chiefs have little overt authority, although they are extremely well respected. Women have a sacred value, rather than secular power. This is changing somewhat under the influence of NGOs and also because of women's leadership role in the peace movement during the Bougainville Civil War.

Although tsunono are in theory genealogically determined, in practice the rule is often broken. If a man is not a good speaker, or if his brother is an exceptional one, the body of tsunono can recognise him as a "mausman" (spokesman in Tok Pisin) or tsonpepeito (guardian in Halia).

Tsunono do not wield arbitrary power. They must represent the interests of their clan. Although the clan cannot (easily) remove a tsunono if he fails to do this, they can make it very difficult for him to mobilise the land and labour resources required to be an effective political agent.

Each sub-clan has its own clan house, known as a tsuhana. These buildings are extremely important in Buka political organisation, they are public buildings in which feasts are conducted for funerals, memorials and reconciliations. Typically, a clan or village will meet to discuss political affairs within the tsuhana. Large wooden slit-gongs are kept there, and struck to call meetings, announce funerals, deaths and other village events.

Tsuhana are associated with the body of the tsunono. Striking the post of a tsuhana in anger is said to be equivalent to assaulting the chief, and requires expiation by the sacrifice of a pig. The construction of a tsuhana is an elaborate process, though the actual building is usually quite humble. Each step in the construction requires the sacrifice of pigs, and this in turn requires mobilisation of the sub-clan and its allies. A tsuhana must be built for a tsunono chief to be regarded as powerful and authoritative.

In general, tsunono and tsuhana have authority over a sub-clan, or hamlet sized territory encompassing between five and twenty nuclear families.  There is, however, a hierarchy of tsunono. Typically several tsuhana will combine under the leadership of a preeminent clan, and the leader of this clan will be called tsunono mal. This relationship is not irrevocable, and requires the assent of other tsunono. It is not possible, or at least it is not easy, for a tsunono to conquer and force other tsuhana to submit to his own.

The most powerful chief is called munihil. This chief has in theory power over clans of a moiety class in a district encompassing perhaps several villages. Such a chief will not be the largest and most powerful landholder, and will rarely have a strong genealogical claim over all the villages. Sometimes such a chief will not even be a local, but a preeminent leader drawn from a distant area. His claim to leadership is not his own, but derives from the collective agreement of the tsunono who "put him forward" so that he can represent them.

Moiety classes and clans 
There are four moiety classes in all Buka societies – Nakaripa, Naboen, Nakas and Natasi. Nakaripa and Naboen are represented by totemic emblems the fowl and the eagle, while Nakas is represented by a dog and there is no consensus as to the totem of Natasi, but kotoiana, a kind of sea hawk, is often suggested, along with pue, the froth of the sea break. Nakaripa and Naboen are prestige classes and the overwhelming majority of the population will claim to belong to one or the other, even if they are genealogically members of the low prestige classes Nakas and Natasi. Traditionally, the latter carried out the prestige classes' dirty work; more recently these groups have become independent ('bruklus') and assert themselves as "clans in their own right".

While Buka will call their moiety categories "clans" in Tok Pisin and English, this is not sociologically accurate and the word is actually used in two different senses, corresponding to what anthropologists would recognise as moieties and clans. (This is also a feature of the Halia language, the Halia term in question is pinaposa.) There are clans, which trace common descent and will occasionally act as corporate entities. These clans are land-holding groups, though often clans will be represented by sub-clans in different villages, or even in different linguistic areas.

By contrast, the moiety classes encompass many different clans. Moiety classification is important in conflict resolution and in the organisation of authority. For a man to succeed his mother's brother as tsunono, the "opposite" moiety (always either Nakaripa or Naboen) will hatsunono (make tsunono). During reconciliation ceremonies, the "opposite" moiety will make speeches setting conditions on the reconciling parties and will preside over sacrifices.

Traditional religious beliefs
Traditional Buka religious beliefs revolve around establishing good relationships between the living and the spirits of the dead as well as wild and clan spirits (known as lilihane) which are believed to inhabit every named geographical feature. (Large rocks and tiny pools of water usually have their own names, as do individual passages in the reef that rings the island). These spirits can have positive or negative attitudes to humans, or can ignore them entirely. Spirits are powerful, but not all-knowing or all powerful. (For instance, when a new person is introduced to an area where a powerful, potentially harmful spirit dwells, he or she must say "it's me again, I'm coming to wash just like I did yesterday!") Spirits govern success in horticulture, fighting and, of course, all things sexual.

Communication with the spirits is established by means of a sacrificial fire. Such fires are most often lit to celebrate funeral feasts for the recently dead. No fire is lit at the time of burial. The day following burial the clan most closely related to the dead will light a fire and offer some cooked fish and taro. The elders of the clan will speak to the fire, addressing the ancient ancestors and asking that they receive the new spirit and aid the living in the road ahead. Aid is needed, for now the clan must quickly acquire several pigs to kill at subsequent feasts marking five days and then ten days since burial. These feasts are more public and their successful organisation is very important for a sub-clan's prestige. These feasts can be quite draining on a clan's finances, since pigs are in short supply in Buka. The spirits will aid in this, and help the clan achieve cohesion.

Throughout Buka, as in most other areas within Melanesia, there is belief in sorcery, called "matuna" or "tsora". There are two kinds of sorcery: one kind was traditionally used by the chief or more exactly by the chief's agents, to punish transgressors in the village. This sorcery was public and the paraphernalia used to effect it was displayed at the tsuhana as a sign of high rank. Contemporary sorcery is understood to be a different kind. It is performed in secret, and usually believed to have been bought by the supposed sorcerer abroad; it is itself a shameful transgression. The most common motivation for suspicions of sorcery relate to unequal economic or political success, which causes "jealousy".

Contemporary religion
Today the overwhelming majority of Buka are Christians, divided into a Roman Catholic majority and a large minority of United Church (Methodist), as well as many different Pentecostal and evangelical sects.

Buka Christianity, especially the Catholic denomination, has a strong tendency to assimilate indigenous and Christian beliefs. The islanders refer to this as "translation". God is called Sunahan, a personal name that is sometimes glossed as "he who plants villages like new shoots of taro", although this is a folk etymology. Sunahan is a creator figure from Buka tradition, and the stories concerning him are secret. In some areas, Jesus is assimilated to Bariosa, Geriana or Matanatsil, hero-figures whose stories are told throughout northern Bougainville and as far as New Ireland. Saint Mary is understood as a chiefly woman, a teitahol or tuhikau. In October, there are processions where statues of St. Mary tour the island. The statues are followed by women carrying traditional women's worksacks, because a chiefly woman ought to travel with taro and betelnut.

Social and religious movements
Buka is famous in the anthropological literature as the site of a large and militant social movement called the Hahalis Welfare Society, as well as several other political and religious movements. These are often termed "cargo cults" by their opponents, although the utility of this term is a matter of dispute amongst anthropologists and historians of the Pacific.

Notes

References
Blackwood, B. 1933 Both Sides of Buka Passage. Oxford: Clarendon Press.
Reagan A.J and Griffin, J.M (eds) 2005 Bougainville Before the Conflict. Canberra: Pandanus Books.
Rimoldi M. and Rimoldi E. 1992 Hahalis and the Labour of Love: A Social Movement on Buka Island. Oxford: Berg.

External links
Buka Island during World War II

Islands of Papua New Guinea
Buka, Papua New Guinea
Geography of the Autonomous Region of Bougainville
Solomon Islands (archipelago)